Akhteruzzaman Babul (1955/56 – 9 March 2019) was a Bangladeshi politician belonging to Jatiya Party. He was elected as an MP of Jatiya Sangsad from Faridpur-5 in 1988. He died on 9 March 2019 at the age of 63.

References

1950s births
2019 deaths
Jatiya Party politicians
People from Faridpur District
4th Jatiya Sangsad members